The Pseudomonadales-1 RNA motif is a conserved RNA structure that was discovered by bioinformatics.
The Pseudomonadales-1 motif often exhibits an apparent sarcin-ricin loop, a type internal loop common in RNA.
Pseudomonadales-1 motif RNAs are found in relatively closely related species of Pseudomonadales.  Despite this narrow distribution, the Pseudomonadales-1 RNA motif does not exhibit many invariant nucleotide positions, suggesting that it does not need to be highly conserved at the primary sequence level.

Pseudomonadales-1 RNAs likely function in trans as small RNAs, as no consistent pattern of associated protein-coding genes is observed.

References

Non-coding RNA